Terry Lynne Jernigan is a neuropsychologist and the director of the Center for Human Development at University of California, San Diego.

Education 
Jernigan graduated from University of California, Irvine with a bachelor's degree before earning a doctorate from University of California, Los Angeles. She interned and completed her postdoctoral research at Stanford University and Palo Alto VA Medical Center.

Career 
In 1984, Jernigan joined the faculty at University of California, San Diego where she is currently a professor of Cognitive Science, Psychiatry, and Radiology. She serves on the advisory council of the National Institutes of Health.

References

External links 
 

Living people
University of California, Irvine alumni
University of California, Los Angeles alumni
University of California, San Diego faculty
Neuropsychologists
Women cognitive scientists
American cognitive neuroscientists
Year of birth missing (living people)
21st-century American women scientists